Apollon Andreyevich Karelin (Russian: Аполло́н Андре́евич Каре́лин; January 23, 1863, St. Petersburg - March 20, 1926, Moscow) was a Russian anarchist.

Born into a wealthy family, Karelin became radicalized in his youth and trained as a lawyer. Passing through a series of radical political affiliations, he was subjected to political persecution, leading him to flee into exile in Paris from 1905 to 1917. There, Karelin founded a group of expatriate Russian anarchists, the Brotherhood of Free Communists, which numbered Volin among its members. The Brotherhood split acrimoniously in 1913 over questions of leadership, accusations of antisemitism, and rumors of infiltration by the Okhrana.

After the Russian Revolution, Karelin returned to Moscow. There, in 1918, he founded the All-Russian Federation of Anarchists, and he became editor of its press organ, Free Life, published in Moscow from 1919 to 1921. Controversially, Karelin urged anarchists to cooperate with the Bolshevik government, gaining a seat on the All-Russian Central Executive Committee.

Karelin died of a cerebral hemorrhage in 1926.

Writings 
Karelin was a prolific writer and theorist whose interests ranged from economics to mysticism. In 1921, he published a utopia, Rossiia v 1930 godu (Russia In 1930). In this novel, according to the blog Tolkovatelya,two English travelers tell about their visit to the anarchist country [...] moving from one village-commune to another and talking with their inhabitants. These conversations are held around what Kropotkin and Karelin themselves are saying in their theoretical works: natural exchange, free distribution of labor, life in communes, based on solidarity, a union of the city and the village without forcible urbanization. The transition to an anarcho-communist system takes place without coercion. Moreover, no laws, other than ethics, regulate the life of communes. Only conviction and moral authority can influence the decision of each person. Nonviolence (as in the Tolstoy communities) is the main feature of this utopia, which distinguishes it from the general background of the revolutionary era.

Bibliography 

 . New York: Izd. Soiuza russkikh rabochikh, 1918.
 . St. Petersburg: Izd. A.S. Suvorin, 1893.
 . St. Peterburg: L.F. Panteli   e   ev, 1894.
 . London: Khleb i volia, 1912.
 . Moscow: Buntar, 1918.
 . Moscow: Vserossiyskiy tsentr. ispolnitel'nyy komitet sovetov r.,s.,k. i k. deputatov, 1919.
  Moscow: Izdanie Vseros. Federacii Anarch.-Kommunist., 1923.
 . Detroit: Izd. Professoinalʹnogo soiuza, 1923.
 . Moscow: Vserossiiskaia federatsiia anarkhistov, 1921.
 . Buenos Aires: Golos Truda, 1921.
 . Buenos Aires: Izd. Rabochei Izdavatelʹskoi Gruppy v Argentine, 1924.
 . Detroit: Profsoiuz, 1955.

Under the pseudonym "A. Kochegarov":

 . Geneva: Izd. Bratstva Volʹnych Obščinnikov, 1912.
 . Bridgeport, Conn.: n.p., 1918.

References 

1863 births
1926 deaths
Anarcho-communists
Russian anarchists
Russian male writers
Soviet anarchists